National Queer Arts Festival (NQAF) is an annual queer festival in San Francisco organized by the Queer Cultural Center and established in 1998 to  coincide with Pride Month.

Other organisations which have assisted over the years include the Harvey Milk Institute, Mission Cultural Center for Latino Art and the Center for African and African American Art & Culture.

Jonathan David Katz is the founding artist director of the festival.

Since 1998, NQAF has presented more than 800 different events that have featured more than 2,300 LGBTQ+ artists including Bill T. Jones, Alice Walker, Robert Rauschenberg, Meredith Monk, Adrienne Rich, Marga Gomez, Justin Chin, Thom Gunn, Cherríe Moraga and Dorothy Allison. NQAF is the largest queer arts festival in North America.

Festivals 
 1998
 June 1, 1999
 June 1-July 4. 2000
 June 1-July 4, 2001
 June 1-July 7 
 May 31- June 29, 2003.
 June 3–27, 2004.
 June 1–30
 2006, June 1–30 
 2007, May 26- June 30
 2008, June 1–30
 2009, May 31 – July 11

References

External links 
 QCC

1998 establishments in California
Film festivals established in 1998
LGBT events in California
LGBT film festivals in the United States
Arts festivals in the United States
Culture of San Francisco
Queer culture